João Ramos do Nascimento (2 October 1917 – 16 November 1996), nicknamed Dondinho, was a Brazilian footballer who played as a centre forward. He was the father, mentor and trainer of Pelé. During his own playing career, Dondinho played for a number of clubs including Fluminense and had also an opportunity to play for Atlético Mineiro.

References

1917 births
1996 deaths
Brazilian footballers
Clube Atlético Mineiro players
Fluminense FC players
Association football forwards
Afro-Brazilian people
Pelé